Kippi Brannon (born Kippi Rolynn Binkley, 1966) is an American country music singer. She made her debut on the country music scene as a teenager, releasing four singles on MCA Records in the early 1980s before leaving her career in favor of a college education. By 1992, she returned to the country music scene, eventually releasing her debut album I'd Be with You in 1997.

Early life
Kippi Rolynn Binkley was born in Nashville, Tennessee. A singer and musician at an early age, she began singing professionally before she was a teenager. At age 12, she gave a performance at a local shopping mall, when an executive for MCA Records discovered her. With the help of record producer Chuck Howard, Jr., Kippi was signed to MCA in 1981. Her surname was altered to Brannon, after Brannon Auto Parts, a local automotive parts store.

Career
Brannon charted three singles in the early 1980s, in addition to receiving a New Female Vocalist of the Year nomination from the Academy of Country Music. She was also signed as an opening act for other country artists. Although she was gaining in popularity, Brannon decided to leave her career and attend college, first at Belmont University and later at the University of Tennessee-Knoxville. During her hiatus from the country music scene, she also married and had a daughter, Kasey; she later divorced and married a second time.

By 1988, Brannon resumed her music career, signing to Curb Records this time around. Her first single for the label, "I Ain't Never", failed to make the charts upon its 1992 release. Working with producers Matt Rollings and James Stroud, she began a search for additional songs to record; however, by the end of 1992, she once again had to take a hiatus, as she had divorced a second time, and had to care for her ailing father. Her first album, I'd Be with You, was released in early 1997, under the production of Mark Bright. Brannon has not recorded since.

Discography

Albums

Singles

Music videos

References

1966 births
American women country singers
American country singer-songwriters
Curb Records artists
Living people
MCA Records artists
Singers from Nashville, Tennessee
Country musicians from Tennessee
Singer-songwriters from Tennessee
21st-century American women